Red Lights Flash was an Austrian punk band from Graz, Austria.

The band was formed in 1997. They have political lyrics and play melodic-punk. Red Lights Flash was the first European band that signed a contract with the punk label A-F Records. They split in October 2010, having played their last shows at the Vans Of The Wall Music Night.

Discography
 1999 Stop When... (Remedy Records)
 2001 And Time Goes By (Household Name Records of London, Rise or Rust Records)
 2005 Free (A-F Records)
 2009 For Your Safety

External links
 Redlightsflash.com (official site)

Austrian punk rock groups
A-F Records artists